Falana sordida is a moth of the family Noctuidae first described by Frederic Moore in 1882.

Distribution
It is found in the Indian subregion, Sri Lanka, Vietnam, Thailand, Taiwan, South China, Peninsular Malaysia, Sumatra, Bali and Borneo.

Description
The distal margin of the forewings has a falcate apex and dentate process dividing the more dorsal half. Facies on the dark greyish ground are the paler grey antemedial band. Transverse white dash of the reniform and submarginal black flecks found near the apex. Eggs depressed and light green dome shaped. Hatchlings are green-tinged honey yellow, and the darker setae arise from blackish-green spots. Mature caterpillars are cylindrical with orange heads and dorsolateral tubercles on their head. Body has black and bluish-white transverse bands with two black bands per segment. Hosts plants are Mallotus and Ficus species.

References

Moths of Asia
Moths described in 1882